Daniel Lalhlimpuia (born 12 September 1997) is an Indian professional footballer who plays as a forward for RoundGlass Punjab in the I-League.

A product of the AIFF Elite Academy, Lalhlimpuia made his professional debut for Bengaluru in 2016. He was considered one of the most promising players in his age group and was named captain of the national under-19 side in 2015. He made his senior international debut in September 2016 against Puerto Rico.

Career

Early career
Born in the village of Serchhip, Mizoram, Lalhlimpuia started playing football in his village and for his school. While playing for his school team he was called in for a trial with the Chandigarh Football Academy which he was successful in. At the Chandigarh Football Academy, Lalhlimpuia was under the coaching of Harjinder Singh. In 2012, during the Administrators Challenge Cup, Lalhlimpuia ended as the tournament top scorer, scoring 19 goals. He stayed with the Chandigarh Football Academy until 2013 when he was selected to join the AIFF Elite Academy.

Bengaluru FC
In August 2015, while with the India U19 side, Lalhlimpuia scored a goal in each of the side's two matches against I-League side Bengaluru. After the matches, he signed a two-year professional contract with Bengaluru FC in November 2015. He made his professional debut for the club on 24 February 2016 during an AFC Cup match against Lao Toyota. He came off the bench for Shankar Sampingiraj as Bengaluru fell 2–1.

Lalhlimpuia scored his first professional goal for the club on 2 April 2016 in the I-League against Mumbai. He came off the bench in the 75th minute and found the net six minutes later to win the match for Bengaluru 1–0. He then scored his second goal of the season in an AFC Cup match on 25 May 2016 against Kitchee. He scored the winning goal during that match in the 51st minute as Bengaluru won 3–2.

The next season, after his temporary loan spell with Chennaiyin, Lalhlimpuia started getting more playing time in the I-League for Bengaluru. On 8 March 2017 he scored the equalizer for the club against Chennai City. He chipped the ball forward for Udanta Singh who crossed the ball into the middle. The ball was parried by Karanjit Singh directly at Lalhlimpuia who put it in the back of the net. Bengaluru drew that match 1–1. He then scored the opening goal in the club's last match of the I-League season against Churchill Brothers on 29 April. Gursimrat Singh Gill crossed the ball from the right and Lalhlimpuia tapped it into the net to give Bengaluru FC a 1–0 lead which they would eventually increase to 3–0. Lalhlimpuia parted ways with Bengaluru at the end of 2017–18 season.

Chennaiyin (loan)
On 4 August 2016, alongside under-20 teammate Uttam Rai, Lalhlimpuia was loaned to Chennaiyin for the 2016 Indian Super League season as a developmental player. However, Lalhlimpuia wouldn't join Chennaiyin officially until his parent club, Bengaluru, completed their AFC Cup commitments.

On 20 November 2016, 15 days after being on the bench at the 2016 AFC Cup Final, Lalhlimpuia made his debut for Chennaiyin. He came on as a 22nd-minute substitute for Jeje Lalpekhlua as Chennaiyin drew Atlético de Kolkata 1–1. He would go on to play two more matches for the side before returning to Bengaluru FC.

International
Lalhlimpuia's first experience with international football came in 2011, when he was included in the India U16 side that would participate in the 2011 SAFF U-16 Championship. He scored two goals during the tournament as India made it to the final, only to lose to Pakistan 2–1. He was then selected to be part of the squad that would represent India in the 2012 AFC U-16 Championship qualifiers. During the qualifiers, Lalhlimpuia and future Chennaiyin teammate Uttam Rai created a good partnership upfront as India qualified for the tournament proper. The next year, during the 2012 AFC U-16 Championship, India finished last in their group without a victory but Lalhlimpuia scored during the final game against China.

In August 2013, Lalhlimpuia was called up to the India U20 side that would travel to China and participate in a couple friendlies. He was later part of the squad that would participate in the 2014 AFC U-19 Championship qualifiers. India eventually failed to qualify for the tournament. In August 2015, Lalhlimpuia was named captain of the under-20 side when they participated in the 2015 SAFF U-19 Championship. He was also part of the under-20 side that participated in the 2016 AFC U-19 Championship qualifiers but once again failed to qualify.

On 25 August 2016, Lalhlimpuia was named into Stephen Constantine's squad for India's friendly against Puerto Rico. He made his debut during that game on 3 September, coming on as a 77th-minute substitute for Sunil Chhetri. India won the match 4–1. On 22 March 2017, Lalhlimpuia made his first start for the national team in a friendly against Cambodia. He played the first-half before being substituted at halftime for Jeje Lalpekhlua. India eventually went on to win the match 3–2.

Career statistics

Club

International

Honours

Club
Bengaluru FC
I-League: 2015–16
Federation Cup: 2016–17

References

External links 
 Bengaluru FC Profile.
 Indian Super League Profile

1997 births
Living people
People from Serchhip
Indian footballers
AIFF Elite Academy players
Bengaluru FC players
Chennaiyin FC players
Association football forwards
Footballers from Mizoram
I-League players
Indian Super League players
India international footballers
India youth international footballers
Odisha FC players